The Last Aristocrat is a 2019 Czech comedy film directed by Jiří Vejdělek. It is based on a book by Evžen Boček of the same name.

Cast
 Hynek Čermák as Frank Kostka
 Tatiana Vilhelmová as Vivien
 Yvona Stolařová as Marie
 Eliška Balzerová as Paní Tichá
 Martin Pechlát as Josef
 Vojtěch Kotek as Benda
 Pavel Liška as Krása
 Zdeněk Piškula as Max
 Táňa Pauhofová as Jess

References

External links
 
 The Last Aristocrat at CSFD.cz 

2019 films
Czech comedy films
2019 comedy films
2010s Czech-language films